The 2000 Colgate Red Raiders football team was an American football team that represented Colgate University during the 2000 NCAA Division I-AA football season. Colgate tied for second in the Patriot League. 

In its fifth season under head coach Dick Biddle, the team compiled a 7–4 record. Barry HoAire, Randall Joseph and Alex Houston were the team captains. 

Despite their winning record, the Red Raiders were outscored 240 to 235. Their 4–2 conference record tied for second place in the seven-team Patriot League standings. 

Colgate was ranked No. 25 in the preseason national Division I-AA poll, but dropped out of the top 25 before it had played a game, and remained unranked for the remainder of the year.

This season marked the final appearance of "Red Raiders" as Colgate's team name. In August 2001, the university trustees announced that all Colgate athletic teams would be known simply as "Raiders". Though the name "Red Raiders" was not originally a reference to Native Americans, such imagery had built up over the years, and the students and faculty who had asked for the change cited increasing sensitivity to racial stereotypes as their reason.

The team played its home games at Andy Kerr Stadium in Hamilton, New York.

Schedule

References

Colgate
Colgate Raiders football seasons
Colgate Red Raiders football